Amirante may refer to:

People
 John Amirante (1934–2018), American singer
 Salvatore Amirante (born 1984), Italian footballer

Places
 Amirante Islands, Seychelles

See also
 Almirante (disambiguation)